Brian Thomas Moynihan (born October 9, 1959) is an American investment banker, businessman and the chairman and CEO of Bank of America. He joined the board of directors, following his promotion to president and CEO in 2010.

Early life and education
Moynihan was born in Marietta, Ohio October 9, in 1959, the sixth of eight children in a family of Irish descent. Moynihan graduated from Brown University in 1981, where he majored in history, co-captained the rugby team, and met his future wife, classmate Susan E. Berry. He earned a Juris Doctor from the University of Notre Dame Law School, before returning to Providence, Rhode Island to join Edwards & Angell LLP, the city's largest corporate law firm.

Career

Moynihan held numerous banking positions before becoming president of consumer and small business banking (SBB) at Bank of America in January 2009.

He joined Fleet Boston bank in April 1993 as a deputy general counsel. From 1999 to April 2004, he served as executive vice president, managing Fleet's brokerage and wealth management division. After Bank of America (BofA) merged with FleetBoston Financial in 2004, he joined BoA as president of global wealth and investment management. He was named CEO of Merrill Lynch after its sale to BoA in September 2008, and became the CEO of Bank of America after Ken Lewis stepped down in 2010.

On August 25, 2011, CNBC's Drew Sandholm  noted that "[d]espite having recently told investors Bank of America ... doesn't need to raise capital, CEO Brian Moynihan will accept $5 billion in capital from famed investor Warren Buffett. The deal not only surprised the Fast Money traders on Thursday, it also caused them to question Moynihan's credibility." 
     
On September 12, 2011, CNBC's John Carney noted that Moynihan had "once again laid out his company's plan to meet regulatory capital requirements and denied that the bank will have to issue new stock to raise capital ... [Moynihan] says that Warren Buffett's $5 billion counts as Tier 1 Capital. But the markets have largely ignored the investment, most likely because it looks a lot more like debt than capital."

On October 26, 2011, Huffington Post blogger Jillian Berman noted that BoA "has also been hammered in the stock and bonds markets" and "was the worst performer in the Dow Jones Industrial Average for two-quarters straight ... while Moody's downgraded the bank last month." She added while Jamie Dimon, JPMorgan Chase's CEO, received a $19 million raise in 2010, Moynihan's salary stayed level at $950,000.

On December 27, 2011, Julia LaRoche wrote in Business Insider that Moynihan "admitted the proposed $5 monthly fee for debit card users wasn't the best idea". She quoted him as saying: "We struck a chord with customers that no one anticipated. We learned our lesson and stopped it." It was later reported that the failed fee plan led to a 20% increase in account closures during the last three months of 2011.

Business Insider noted that "a group of law professors and activists from a non-profit called Public Citizen sent a 24 page petition to Fed Chairman Ben Bernanke and Treasury Secretary Geithner asking them to consider breaking up and reforming Bank of America.

In July 2020, Moynihan was named Chief Executive Magazine’s 2020 CEO Of The Year.

He currently lives in Wellesley, Massachusetts, and frequently commutes between Boston and Bank of America's headquarters in Charlotte, North Carolina using Bank of America's private jets. This practice has come under scrutiny from some shareholders.

Criticism
The bank's 2012 shareholder meeting in Charlotte, North Carolina convened "as protests swirled inside and outside", according to the San Francisco Chronicle. There were complaints from shareholders regarding the bank's mortgage servicing operations, decreased share prices, and other issues. Protesters converged outside the building, which they were barred from entering by police and metal barricades. In response to the criticisms of the bank's mortgage servicing operations, Moynihan tried to reassure the audience, saying "you can call us and we will figure it out".

In 2012, Moynihan, alongside several other CEO's, faced heavy criticism from Bernie Sanders in a report titled "Top Corporate Tax Dodgers". According to the report, Moynihan's Bank of America paid no federal income tax in 2010 and received a $1.9 billion tax refund despite making $4.4 billion in profits. The report also includes criticisms of Bank of America's use of tax havens.

References

External links

1959 births
Living people
American bankers
American chief executives of financial services companies
American people of Irish descent
Bank of America executives
Brown University alumni
Merrill (company) people
People from Marietta, Ohio
Directors of Bank of America
Catholics from Ohio
Notre Dame Law School alumni